Jono Clarke (24 May 1944 – 2 June 2020) was a Rhodesian cricketer. He played in fifteen first-class matches from 1967/68 to 1969/70. Clarke was the first batsman to score a century on his first-class debut for the Rhodesia cricket team.

See also
 List of Rhodesian representative cricketers

References

External links
 

1944 births
2020 deaths
Rhodesia cricketers
Sportspeople from Gweru